MFK Dukla Banská Bystrica is a Slovak football club from the town of Banská Bystrica. The club plays at the SNP Stadium. After being relegated from the Slovak 2. liga in 2017, the team had financial problems.

History
 1965 – Founded as VTJ Dukla Banská Bystrica
 1967 – Renamed AS Dukla Banská Bystrica
 1975 – Renamed ASVS Dukla Banská Bystrica
 1984 – First European qualification, 1985
 1992 – Renamed FK Dukla Banská Bystrica
 2017 – Merged with ŠK Kremnička and renamed to MFK Dukla Banská Bystrica

Honours

Domestic
 Czechoslovakia
 Czechoslovak First League (1925–93)
 4th place (1): 1983–84
 1.SNL (1st Slovak National football league) (1969–1993)
  Winners (1): 1982–83

 Slovakia
 Slovak Superliga (1993–present)
  Runners-up (1):  2003–04
 Slovenský Pohár (Slovakian Cup) (1961–)
  Winners (2): 1981, 2005
  Runners-up (3): 1970, 1984, 1999

Czechoslovak and Slovak Top Goalscorer
The Czechoslovak League top scorer from 1944 to 1945 until 1992–93. Since the 1993–94 Slovak League Top scorer.

1Shared award

Affiliated clubs
The following club was affiliated with FK Dukla Banská Bystrica:
  FC Viktoria Plzeň (2014–2017)

Sponsorship

Current squad
As of 22 February 2023

For recent transfers, see List of Slovak football transfers winter 2022-23.

Staff

Current technical staff
As of 2 July 2022

Results

League and Cup history
Slovak League only (1993–2017)
{|class="wikitable"
! style="color:#FFFFFF; background:#BC0008;"| Season
! style="color:#FFFFFF; background:#BC0008;"| Division (Name)
! style="color:#FFFFFF; background:#BC0008;"| Pos./Teams
! style="color:#FFFFFF; background:#BC0008;"| Pl.
! style="color:#FFFFFF; background:#BC0008;"| W
! style="color:#FFFFFF; background:#BC0008;"| D
! style="color:#FFFFFF; background:#BC0008;"| L
! style="color:#FFFFFF; background:#BC0008;"| GS
! style="color:#FFFFFF; background:#BC0008;"| GA
! style="color:#FFFFFF; background:#BC0008;"| P
! style="color:#FFFFFF; background:#BC0008;"|Slovak Cup
! style="color:#FFFFFF; background:#BC0008;" colspan=2|Europe
! style="color:#FFFFFF; background:#BC0008;"|Top Scorer (Goals)
|-
|align=center|1993–94
|align=center|1st (Mars Superliga)
|align=center|9/(12)
|align=center|32
|align=center|9
|align=center|9
|align=center|14
|align=center|31
|align=center|43
|align=center|27
|align=center|Quarter-finals
|align=center|
|align=center|
|align=center|
|-
|align=center|1994–95
|align=center|1st (Mars Superliga)
|align=center|5/(12)
|align=center|32
|align=center|12
|align=center|8
|align=center|12
|align=center|53
|align=center|44
|align=center|44
|align=center|Round 1
|align=center|
|align=center|
|align=center| Róbert Semeník (18)
|-
|-
|align=center|1995–96
|align=center|1st (Mars Superliga)
|align=center|4/(12) 
|align=center|32
|align=center|12
|align=center|11
|align=center|9
|align=center|39
|align=center|36
|align=center|47
|align=center|Semi-finals
|align=center|
|align=center|
|align=center| Norbert Toman (6)
|-
|align=center|1996–97
|align=center|1st (Mars Superliga)
|align=center|5/(16)
|align=center|30
|align=center|13
|align=center|5
|align=center|12
|align=center|48
|align=center|37
|align=center|44
|align=center|Round 2
|align=center|
|align=center|
|align=center| Ivan Lapšanský (9)
|-
|align=center|1997–98
|align=center|1st (Mars Superliga)
|align=center|13/(16)
|align=center|30
|align=center|7
|align=center|9
|align=center|14
|align=center|32
|align=center|46
|align=center|30
|align=center|Quarter-finals
|align=center|
|align=center| 
|align=center|  Štefan Rusnák (8)
|-
|align=center|1998–99
|align=center|1st (Mars Superliga)
|align=center|11/(16)
|align=center|30
|align=center|8
|align=center|10
|align=center|12
|align=center|34
|align=center|46
|align=center|34
|align=center bgcolor=silver|Runners-up
|align=center|
|align=center|
|align=center|  Štefan Rusnák (11)   Ľubomír Faktor (11) 
|-
|align=center|1999–00
|align=center|1st (Mars Superliga)
|align=center bgcolor=red|15/(16)
|align=center|30
|align=center|7
|align=center|2
|align=center|21
|align=center|27
|align=center|53
|align=center|23
|align=center|Semi-finals
|align=center| UC
|align=center| 1.R ( AFC Ajax)
|align=center|  Ľubomír Faktor (6)
|-
|align=center|2000–01
|align=center|2nd (1. Liga)
|align=center|11/(18)
|align=center|34
|align=center|13
|align=center|7
|align=center|14
|align=center|39
|align=center|32
|align=center|46
|align=center|Quarter-finals
|align=center|
|align=center|
|align=center|   Eugen Bari (4)   Jaroslav Kamenský (4)
|-
|align=center|2001–02
|align=center|2nd (1. Liga)
|align=center|6/(16)
|align=center|30
|align=center|11
|align=center|11
|align=center|8
|align=center|44
|align=center|32
|align=center|44
|align=center|Round 1
|align=center|
|align=center|
|align=center|  Ivan Bartoš (17) 
|-
|align=center|2002–03
|align=center|2nd (1. Liga)
|align=center bgcolor=green|1/(16)
|align=center|30
|align=center|21
|align=center|6
|align=center|3
|align=center|53
|align=center|18
|align=center|69
|align=center|Round 1
|align=center|
|align=center|
|align=center| Ivan Bartoš (10) 
|-
|align=center|2003–04
|align=center|1st (Corgoň Liga)
|align=center bgcolor=silver|2/(10)
|align=center|36
|align=center|17
|align=center|13
|align=center|6
|align=center|58
|align=center|36
|align=center|64
|align=center|Round 2
|align=center|
|align=center|
|align=center| Róbert Semeník (15)
|-
|align=center|2004–05
|align=center|1st (Corgoň Liga)
|align=center bgcolor=tan|3/(10)
|align=center|36
|align=center|13
|align=center|13
|align=center|10
|align=center|45
|align=center|38
|align=center|52
|align=center bgcolor=gold|Winner
|align=center|UC
|align=center| 1.R ( S.L. Benfica)
|align=center|  Martin Jakubko (14)
|-
|align=center|2005–06
|align=center|1st (Corgoň Liga)
|align=center|6/(10)
|align=center|36
|align=center|12
|align=center|6
|align=center|18
|align=center|37
|align=center|42
|align=center|42
|align=center|Round 2
|align=center|UC
|align=center| Q2 ( Groclin Grodzisk)
|align=center| Róbert Semeník (18)
|-
|align=center|2006–07
|align=center|1st (Corgoň Liga)
|align=center|7/(12)
|align=center|28
|align=center|7
|align=center|6
|align=center|15
|align=center|24
|align=center|46
|align=center|27
|align=center|Quarter-finals
|align=center|
|align=center|
|align=center|  Ivan Lietava (9)
|-
|align=center|2007–08
|align=center|1st (Corgoň Liga)
|align=center|8/(12)
|align=center|33
|align=center|10
|align=center|9
|align=center|14
|align=center|41
|align=center|37
|align=center|39
|align=center|Round 2
|align=center|
|align=center|
|align=center|  Michal Ďuriš (6)
|-
|align=center|2008–09
|align=center|1st (Corgoň Liga)
|align=center|10/(12)
|align=center|33
|align=center|9
|align=center|8
|align=center|16
|align=center|30
|align=center|39
|align=center|35
|align=center|Round 2
|align=center|
|align=center| 
|align=center|  Dušan Uškovič (8)
|-
|align=center|2009–10
|align=center|1st (Corgoň Liga)
|align=center bgcolor=tan|3/(12)
|align=center|33
|align=center|15
|align=center|11
|align=center|7
|align=center|45
|align=center|30
|align=center|56
|align=center|Round 2
|align=center|
|align=center|
|align=center|  Dušan Uškovič (7)
|-
|align=center|2010–11
|align=center|1st (Corgoň Liga)
|align=center|5/(12)
|align=center|33
|align=center|13
|align=center|9
|align=center|11
|align=center|39
|align=center|32
|align=center|48
|align=center|Round 3
|align=center|UC
|align=center|Q2 ( FC Zestafoni)
|align=center|  Róbert Pich (7)
|-
|align=center|2011–12
|align=center|1st (Corgoň Liga)
|align=center|9/(12)
|align=center|33
|align=center|9
|align=center|10
|align=center|14
|align=center|37
|align=center|44
|align=center|37
|align=center|Round 1
|align=center| 
|align=center|
|align=center|  Martin Jakubko (10)
|-
|align=center|2012–13
|align=center|1st (Corgoň Liga)
|align=center|9/(12)
|align=center|33
|align=center|9
|align=center|11
|align=center|13
|align=center|28
|align=center|32
|align=center|38
|align=center|Quarter-finals
|align=center|
|align=center|
|align=center|  Matúš Turňa (6) 
|-
|align=center|2013–14
|align=center|1st (Corgoň Liga)
|align=center|8/(12)
|align=center|33
|align=center|11
|align=center|9
|align=center|13
|align=center|48
|align=center|48
|align=center|42
|align=center|Round 2
|align=center|
|align=center|
|align=center|  Pavol Jurčo (8)   Fabián Slančík (8)
|-
|align=center|2014–15
|align=center|1st (Fortuna Liga)
|align=center bgcolor=red|12/(12)
|align=center|33
|align=center|4
|align=center|10
|align=center|19
|align=center|29
|align=center|57
|align=center|22
|align=center|Semi-finals
|align=center|
|align=center|
|align=center|  Patrik Vajda (7)
|-
|align=center|2015–16
|align=center|2nd (DOXXbet Liga)
|align=center|13/(24)
|align=center|32
|align=center|16
|align=center|5
|align=center|11
|align=center|45
|align=center|33
|align=center|53
|align=center|Round 3
|align=center|
|align=center|
|align=center|  Endy Opoku Bernadina (7)
|-
|align=center|2016–17
|align=center|2nd (DOXXbet liga)
|align=center bgcolor=red|17/(24)
|align=center|32
|align=center|10
|align=center|6
|align=center|16
|align=center|36
|align=center|55
|align=center|36 
|align=center|Round 3
|align=center|
|align=center|
|align=center|  Radoslav Ďanovský (12)
|-
|align=center|2017–18
|align=center|3rd (TIPOS III.liga Middle)
|align=center bgcolor=green|1/(16)
|align=center|30
|align=center|21
|align=center|6
|align=center|3
|align=center|60
|align=center|18
|align=center|69 
|align=center|Did not enter
|align=center|
|align=center|
|align=center|  Lukáš Laksik (17)
|-
|align=center|2018–19
|align=center|2nd (II. liga)
|align=center|6/(16)
|align=center|30
|align=center|12
|align=center|10
|align=center|8
|align=center|49
|align=center|35
|align=center|46 
|align=center|Round 3
|align=center|
|align=center|
|align=center|  Róbert Polievka (9)
|-
|align=center|2019–20
|align=center|2nd (II. liga)
|align=center|2/(16)
|align=center|20
|align=center|14
|align=center|3
|align=center|3
|align=center|52
|align=center|23
|align=center|45 
|align=center|1/8 Fin
|align=center|
|align=center|
|align=center|  Róbert Polievka (12)
|-
|align=center|2020–21
|align=center|2nd (II. liga)
|align=center|2/(16)
|align=center|28
|align=center|17
|align=center|5
|align=center|6
|align=center|70
|align=center|38
|align=center|56 
|align=center|Semi-finals
|align=center|
|align=center|
|align=center|  Miladin Vujošević (17)
|-
|align=center|2021–22
|align=center|2nd (II. liga)
|align=center bgcolor=green|2/(16)
|align=center|30
|align=center|21
|align=center|6
|align=center|3
|align=center|62
|align=center|24
|align=center|69 
|align=center|Round 3
|align=center|
|align=center|
|align=center|  Róbert Polievka (18)
|}

European competition history

UEFA-administered

Not UEFA-administered

Player records

Most goals

Players whose name is listed in bold are still active.

Notable players
Had international caps for their respective countries. Players whose name is listed in bold represented their countries while playing for Dukla.

Past (and present) players who are the subjects of Wikipedia articles can be found here.

Managers

 Arnošt Hložek (1966–67)
 Bohumil Musil (1969–71)
 Oldřich Bříza (197?–79)
 Juraj Lakota (1980)
 Jozef Adamec (1981–87)
 Anton Dragúň (1987–89)
 Stanislav Jarábek (1989–91)
 Jozef Adamec (1991)
 Anton Hrušecký (1991–9?)
 Anton Jánoš (1993–95)
 Ján Ilavský (199?–96)
 Ján Kocian (1996–97)
 Peter Benedik (1996–97)
 Stanislav Jarábek (1998–99)
 Miloš Tagos (1999–00)
 Igor Novák (2000–01)
 Anton Jánoš (2001–03)
 Ladislav Molnár (2003–04)
 Václav Daněk (2004–05)
 Jozef Prochotský (2005–06)
 Dušan Radolský (2006)
 Ladislav Molnár (2007)
 Štefan Horný (25 Sept 2007 – 27 Aug 2008)
 Anton Jánoš (26 Aug 2008 – 30 Nov 2008)
 Jozef Jankech (1 Dev 2008 – 30 June 2010)
 Karol Marko (1 July 2010 – 8 Nov 2010)
 Štefan Zaťko (8 Nov 2010 – 30 June 2011)
 Norbert Hrnčár (1 July2012 – 9 Oct 2014)
 Štefan Rusnák (9 Oct 2014 – 26 June 2015)
 Ľubomír Faktor (26 June 2015 – 18 Oct 2016)
 Dušan Tóth (18 Oct 2016 – 26 Sep 2018)
 Stanislav Varga (26 Sep 2018 – 1 July 2022)
 Michal Ščasný (2 July 2022 – present)

References

External links
 Official website 

 
Banska Bystrica, Dukla FK
Military association football clubs
Banska Bystrica, Dukla FK
Association football clubs established in 1965
1965 establishments in Slovakia